Marika Nezer (1906 – 18 July 1989) was a Greek actress.  She was the daughter of Konstantinos Nezer, brother of Christoforos Nezer (1903–1996) and cousin of Christoforos Nezer (1887–1970) and granddaughter of Christoforos Nezer, fort chief of Athens and an aide-de-camp of King Otto of Greece.

Biography

Early life
She entered the theatrical scene at the age of 13 in Cairo where she understood at an excelled spot mainly in the musical review spots.  She also distinguished in Greece in the review presentations and the councils of Sofia Vembo with the characteristic type of a characterist.

Later life
Until her elder age, she appeared in several movies.

She was married to the actor Errikos Kontarinis.

She died on 18 July 1989 and was buried in Vyronas.

External links
IMDB.com

1906 births
1989 deaths
Actresses from Istanbul
Greek stage actresses
Greek film actresses
Actresses from Athens
20th-century Greek actresses
Emigrants from the Ottoman Empire to Greece
Greek expatriates in Egypt
Constantinopolitan Greeks